Mask of the Avenger is a 1951 American historical adventure film directed by Phil Karlson starring John Derek, Anthony Quinn and Jody Lawrance.

Derek portrays Renatu Dimorna, the son of an Italian aristocrat, who vows revenge after his father is murdered during the European political upheaval of 1848.

Plot

Cast
John Derek as Capt. Renato Dimorna
Anthony Quinn as Viovanni Larocca
Jody Lawrance as Maria d'Orsini
Arnold Moss as Colardi
Eugene Iglesias as Rollo D'Anterras
Dickie Leroy as Jacopo (as Dickie LeRoy)
Harry Cording as Zio
Ian Wolfe as Signor Donner

References

External links 
 
 
 

1951 films
Columbia Pictures films
1950s historical adventure films
Films set in the 1840s
Films set in Italy
Films directed by Phil Karlson
Films adapted into comics
American historical adventure films
Films scored by Mario Castelnuovo-Tedesco
1950s English-language films
1950s American films